The following list of Carnegie libraries in Louisiana provides detailed information on United States Carnegie libraries in Louisiana, where 9 libraries were built from 4 grants (totaling $380,000) awarded by the Carnegie Corporation of New York from 1901 to 1907. As of 2013, 6 of these buildings are still standing, and 3 still operate as libraries.

Key

Carnegie libraries

Notes

References

Note: The above references, while all authoritative, are not entirely mutually consistent. Some details of this list may have been drawn from one of the references (usually Jones) without support from the others.  Reader discretion is advised.

Louisiana
 
Libraries
Libraries